Lidija is a feminine given name. Notable people with the name include:

Lidija Abrlić (born 1969), former Yugoslavian and Croatian basketball player
Lidija Auza (1914–1989), Latvian painter
Lidija Bajuk (born 1965), Croatian singer-songwriter and poet
Lidija Benedetič-Lapajne (born 1959), Slovenian athlete
Lidija Bizjak (born 1976), concert pianist
Lidija Bradara, politician from Bosnia and Herzegovina
Lidija Cvetkovic (born 1967), contemporary Australian poet
Lidija Cvijić (born 1998), Serbian handball player
Lidija Dimkovska (born 1971), Macedonian poet, novelist and translator
Lidija Doroņina-Lasmane (born 1925), Latvian dissident
Lidija Figner (1853–1920), Russian revolutionary
Lidija Franklin (1917–2019), American ballet dancer and teacher of Latvian descent
Lidija Pozaić Frketić (born 1974), member of the World Scout Committee
Lidija Horvat (born 1982), Croatian handball player
Lidija Horvat-Dunjko, Croatian opera singer
Lidija Liepiņa (1891–1985), Latvian chemist
Lidija Manić (born c. 1953), Serbian beauty pageant titleholder
Lidija Meškaitytė (1926–1993), Lithuanian painter
Lidija Mihajlović (born 1968), Serbian sport shooter
Lidija Osterc (1928–2006), Slovene painter and illustrator
Lidija Ivanovna Savic-Ljubickaja (1886–1982), Soviet botanist, bryologist, and professor
Lidija Sotlar (1929–2018), Slovenian ballerina and teacher
Lidija Turčinović (born 1994), Serbian–French basketball player
Lidija Vučković (born 1988), Serbian professional basketball player
 Lidija Vukićević (born 1962), Serbian film and TV actress

See also 
Lidia
Lidiya
Lydia

Feminine given names
Serbian feminine given names